Weather Center (originally WeatherScope) was a news and weather program produced by The Weather Channel in Atlanta, Georgia. Initially, Weather Center was the lone program for The Weather Channel. By 2000, the show had started being significantly pared down. By the end of 2008, Weather Center only aired for one hour a day during the week and two hours on weekends. The 4pm hour of Weather Center (2006 to 2009) was replaced by PM Edition.

History 
In 1995, The Weather Channel introduced WeatherScope, a show aired every 30 minutes, which featured the day's top weather stories, forecasts and severe weather coverage. The program was limited to mornings and evenings only before being broadcast 24/7. WeatherScope was carried through the 1996 channel redesign. Prior to 1996, WeatherScope This Morning was a morning version, differing only in presentation. In 1997, the weather wheel system was retooled with a new TWC programming schedule.

WeatherScope was renamed Weather Center on March 10, 1998. The show continued to be the bulk of the channel's schedule, running every half-hour throughout the whole day (excluding the 30-minute overnight The Weather Classroom program for Cable in the Classroom). TWC's meteorologists would show weather forecasts and current conditions around the United States as well as international forecasts. From its debut in 1998 through early 2000, the program was divided into three blocks: Weather Center AM from 5 to 11 AM, Weather Center from 11 AM to 7 PM and 1 to 5 AM, and Weather Center PM from 7 PM to 1 AM. In 2001, the 'AM' block was replaced with First Outlook (5–7 AM) and Your Weather Today (7–9 AM), and in August of that year much of the 'PM' block was replaced with Evening Edition. In April 2001, Weekend Now replaced the 7–11 AM portion of Weather Center AM; the latter's remaining 5–7 AM portion was replaced by Weekend Outlook in 2003. A revamp of the channel's presentation in June 2001 dropped the "AM/PM" distinction; this revamp also saw a slew of programs (both long-form and forecast-based) erode the Weather Center evening and weekend time slots; by 2008, only one hour remained.

Beginning in September 2003, the official hosts were Rich Johnson and Jeanetta Jones. On September 25, 2006, TWC announced major PM changes. Both hosts departed as a result of this. The new hosts became Vivian Brown and Jeff Morrow. Johnson left for Evening Edition and Jones left TWC altogether. In May 2008, Morrow moved to First Outlook and was replaced by Nick Walker. Brown and Walker were the last official anchors.

On Sunday, March 1, 2009, the original Weather Center was discontinued and a new program, Weather Center Live, debuted with an entirely different format.

Hosts 
Rich Johnson (2003–2006) (left for Evening Edition)
Jeanetta Jones (2003–2006) (left TWC)
Jeff Morrow (2006–2008) (left for First Outlook)
Nick Walker (2008–2009) (program cancellation)
Vivian Brown (2006–2009) (program cancellation)

The Weather Channel original programming
1996 American television series debuts
2009 American television series endings